Malagundla Sankaranarayana is a former cabinet minister from Andhra Pradesh, India. He is a leader of the YSR Congress party. He won as MLA from Penukonda constituency of Anantapur district.

Career 
Sankaranarayana began his political entry by joining Telugu Desam Party in 1995. He became Municipal councillor of Dharmavaram in 2005. He joined YSR Congress Party in 2011. In 2014 assembly elections he contested from Penukonda seat was defeated by B K Parthasarathi of TDP, with 17,415 margin. But in 2019 elections he was elected as an MLA and got cabinet minister post. He is serving as minister for BC welfare. He is continuing as Anantapur district YSRCP president since 2012. On 22 July 2020 he has been allotted the Roads and Buildings department in Cabinet reshuffle. In April 2022 he was dropped from Cabinet during  reshuffle. Later he was appointed as YSRCP Sri Sathya Sai district chief.

References 

Living people
YSR Congress Party politicians
Telugu Desam Party politicians
People from Anantapur district
Year of birth missing (living people)
Andhra Pradesh MLAs 2019–2024